Dietrich Bonhoeffer (4 February 1906 – 9 April 1945) was a German Lutheran pastor, theologian and anti-Nazi dissident who was a key founding member of the Confessing Church. His writings on Christianity's role in the secular world have become widely influential; his 1937 book The Cost of Discipleship is described as a modern classic. Apart from his theological writings, Bonhoeffer was known for his staunch resistance to the Nazi dictatorship, including vocal opposition to Adolf Hitler's euthanasia program and genocidal persecution of the Jews. He was arrested in April 1943 by the Gestapo and imprisoned at Tegel prison for one-and-a-half years. Later, he was transferred to Flossenbürg concentration camp.

Bonhoeffer was accused of being associated with the 20 July plot to assassinate Hitler and was tried along with other accused plotters, including former members of the Abwehr (the German Military Intelligence Office). He was hanged on 9 April 1945 during the collapse of the Nazi regime.

Early life

Childhood and family 
Bonhoeffer was born on 4 February 1906 in Breslau, then Germany (now Poland), into a large family. In addition to his other siblings, Dietrich had a twin sister, Sabine Bonhoeffer Leibholz: he and Sabine were the sixth and seventh children out of eight. His father was Karl Bonhoeffer, a psychiatrist and neurologist, noted for his criticism of Sigmund Freud; and his mother Paula Bonhoeffer (née von Hase) was a teacher and the granddaughter of Protestant theologian Karl von Hase and painter Stanislaus von Kalckreuth. Bonhoeffer's family dynamic and his parents' values enabled him to receive a high level of education and encouraged his curiosity, which impacted his ability to lead others around him, specifically in the church setting. His oldest brother Karl Friedrich Bonhoeffer became a chemist, and, along with Paul Harteck, discovered the spin isomers of hydrogen in 1929. Walter Bonhoeffer, the second born of the Bonhoeffer family, was killed in action during World War I when the twins were 12. The third Bonhoeffer child, Klaus, was a lawyer until he was executed for his involvement in the 20 July plot.

Both of Bonhoeffer's older sisters, Ursula Bonhoeffer Schleicher and Christel Bonhoeffer von Dohnanyi, married men who the Nazis eventually executed. Christel was imprisoned by the Nazis but survived. Sabine and their youngest sister Susanne Bonhoeffer Dress, each married men who survived Nazism. His cousin Karl-Günther von Hase was the German Ambassador to the United Kingdom from 1970 to 1977. His nephew, Christoph von Dohnanyi, son of Hans von Dohnanyi and Christel Bonhoeffer von Dohnanyi, is a prominent orchestral conductor, most notably musical director of the Cleveland (OH) Orchestra from 1984 to 2002, and the London Philharmonia Orchestra.

Bonhoeffer completed his Staatsexamen, the equivalent to a master's degree, at the Protestant Faculty of Theology of the University of Tübingen. At the age of 21, on 17 December 1927, he went on to complete his Doctor of Theology degree (Dr. theol.) from Humboldt University of Berlin, graduating summa cum laude.

Studies in America 
Still too young to be ordained, at the age of twenty-four, Bonhoeffer went to the United States in 1930 for postgraduate study and a teaching fellowship at New York City's Union Theological Seminary. Although Bonhoeffer found the American seminary's theological education lacked intellectual rigour ("There is no theology here."), he underwent life-changing experiences and made significant friendships. He studied under Reinhold Niebuhr and met Frank Fisher, a black fellow-seminarian who introduced him to the Abyssinian Baptist Church in Harlem, where Bonhoeffer taught Sunday school and formed a lifelong love for African-American  spirituals, a collection of which he took back to Germany. He heard Adam Clayton Powell Sr. preach the Gospel of Social Justice, and became sensitive to the social injustices experienced by ethnic minorities in the US as well as the ineptitude of churches to bring about integration.

Bonhoeffer began to see things "from below"—from the perspective of those who suffer oppression. He observed, "Here one can truly speak and hear about sin and grace and the love of God… the Black Christ is preached with rapturous passion and vision." Later Bonhoeffer referred to his impressions abroad as the point at which he "turned from phraseology to reality." He also learned to drive an automobile, although he failed the driving test three times. He borrowed a 1924 Oldsmobile sedan from a member of the Greenville Community Church in Westchester County in order to drive to Mexico.

Career 

After returning to Germany in 1931, Bonhoeffer became a lecturer in systematic theology at the University of Berlin. Deeply interested in ecumenism, he was appointed by the World Alliance for Promoting International Friendship through the Churches (a forerunner of the World Council of Churches) as one of its three European youth secretaries. At this time he seems to have undergone something of a personal conversion from being a theologian primarily attracted to the intellectual side of Christianity to being a dedicated man of faith, resolved to carry out the teaching of Christ as he found it revealed in the Gospels. On 15 November 1931, at the age of 25, he was ordained at Old-Prussian United  in Berlin-Tiergarten.

Confessing church 
Bonhoeffer's promising academic and ecclesiastical career was dramatically knocked off course by the Nazi ascent to power on 30 January 1933. He was a determined opponent of the regime from its first days. Two days after Hitler was installed as Chancellor, Bonhoeffer delivered a radio address in which he attacked Hitler and warned Germany against slipping into an idolatrous cult of the Führer (leader), who could very well turn out to be Verführer (misleader, or seducer). His broadcast was abruptly cut off, though it is unclear whether the newly elected Nazi regime was responsible. In April 1933, Bonhoeffer raised the first voice for church resistance to Hitler's persecution of Jews, declaring that the church must not simply "bandage the victims under the wheel, but I am a spoke in the wheel itself."

In November 1932, two months before the Nazi takeover, there had been an election for presbyters and synodals (church officials) of the German Landeskirche (Protestant historical established churches). This election was marked by a struggle within the Old-Prussian Union Evangelical Church between the nationalistic German Christian (Deutsche Christen) movement and Young Reformers—a struggle that threatened to explode into schism. In July 1933, Hitler unconstitutionally imposed new church elections. Bonhoeffer put all his efforts into the election, campaigning for the selection of independent, non-Nazi officials.

Despite Bonhoeffer's efforts, in the July election an overwhelming number of key church positions went to Nazi-supported Deutsche Christen people. The Deutsche Christen won a majority in the general synod of the Old-Prussian Union Evangelical Church and all its provincial synods except Westphalia, and in synods of all other Protestant church bodies, except for the Lutheran churches of Bavaria, Hanover, and Württemberg. The non-Nazi opposition regarded these bodies as uncorrupted "intact churches," as opposed to the other so-called "destroyed churches."

In opposition to Nazification, Bonhoeffer urged an interdict upon all pastoral services (baptisms, weddings, funerals, etc.), but Karl Barth and others advised against such a radical proposal. In August 1933, Bonhoeffer and Hermann Sasse were deputized by opposition church leaders to draft the Bethel Confession, a new statement of faith in opposition to the Deutsche Christen movement. Notable for affirming God's fidelity to Jews as His chosen people, the Bethel Confession was so watered down to make it more palatable that Bonhoeffer ultimately refused to sign it.

In September 1933, the national church synod at Wittenberg voluntarily passed a resolution to apply the Aryan paragraph within the church, meaning that pastors and church officials of Jewish descent were to be removed from their posts. Regarding this as an affront to the principle of baptism, Martin Niemöller founded the Pfarrernotbund (Pastors' Emergency League). In November, a rally of 20,000 Deutsche Christens demanded the removal of the Old Testament from the Bible, which was seen by many as heresy, further swelling the ranks of the Emergency League.

Within weeks of its founding, more than a third of German pastors had joined the Emergency League. It was the forerunner of the Bekennende Kirche (Confessing Church), which aimed to preserve traditional, Biblically based Christian beliefs and practices. The Barmen Declaration, drafted by Barth in May 1934 and adopted by the Confessing Church, insisted that Christ, not the Führer, was the head of the church. The adoption of the declaration has often been viewed as a triumph, although by 's estimate, only 20% of German pastors supported the Confessing Church.

Ministries in London 
When Bonhoeffer was offered a parish post in eastern Berlin in the autumn of 1933, he refused it in protest at the nationalist policy, and accepted a two-year appointment as a pastor of two German-speaking Protestant churches in London: the German Lutheran Church in Dacres Road, Sydenham, and the German Reformed Church of St Paul's, Goulston Street, Whitechapel. He explained to Barth that he had found little support for his views – even among friends – and that "it was about time to go for a while into the desert." Barth regarded this as running away from real battle. He sharply rebuked Bonhoeffer, saying, "I can only reply to all the reasons and excuses which you put forward: 'And what of the German Church?'" Barth accused Bonhoeffer of abandoning his post and wasting his "splendid theological armory" while "the house of your church is on fire," and chided him to return to Berlin "by the next ship".

Bonhoeffer, however, did not go to England simply to avoid trouble at home; he hoped to put the ecumenical movement to work in the interest of the Confessing Church. He continued his involvement with the Confessing Church, running up a high telephone bill to maintain his contact with Martin Niemöller. In international gatherings, Bonhoeffer rallied people to oppose the Deutsche Christen movement and its attempt to amalgamate Nazi nationalism with the Christian gospel. When Bishop —the official in charge of German Lutheran Church foreign affairs—traveled to London to warn Bonhoeffer to abstain from any ecumenical activity not directly authorized by Berlin, Bonhoeffer refused to abstain.

Underground seminaries 
In 1935, Bonhoeffer was offered a coveted opportunity to study non-violent resistance under Gandhi in his ashram. However, remembering Barth's rebuke, Bonhoeffer decided to return to Germany instead, where he was the head at an underground seminary in Finkenwalde for training Confessing Church pastors. As the Nazi suppression of the Confessing Church intensified, Barth was driven back to Switzerland in 1935; Niemöller was arrested in July 1937; and in August 1936, Bonhoeffer's authorization to teach at the University of Berlin was revoked after he was denounced as a "pacifist and enemy of the state" by Theodor Heckel.Bonhoeffer's efforts for the underground seminaries included securing necessary funds. He found a great benefactor in Ruth von Kleist-Retzow. In times of trouble, Bonhoeffer's former students and their wives would take refuge in von Kleist-Retzow's Pomeranian estate, and Bonhoeffer was a frequent guest. Later he fell in love with Kleist-Retzow's granddaughter, Maria von Wedemeyer, to whom he became engaged three months before his arrest in 1943. By August 1937, Himmler had decreed the education and examination of Confessing Church ministry candidates illegal. In September 1937, the Gestapo closed the seminary at Finkenwalde, and by November arrested 27 pastors and former students. It was around this time that Bonhoeffer published his best-known book, The Cost of Discipleship, a study on the Sermon on the Mount, in which he not only attacked "cheap grace" as a cover for ethical laxity, but also preached "costly grace".

Bonhoeffer spent the next two years secretly traveling from one eastern German village to another to conduct "seminary on the run" supervision of his students, most of whom were working illegally in small parishes within the old-Prussian Ecclesiastical Province of Pomerania. The von Blumenthal family hosted the seminary on its estate of Groß Schlönwitz. The pastors of Groß Schlönwitz and neighbouring villages supported the education by employing and housing the students (among whom was Eberhard Bethge, who later edited Bonhoeffer's Letters and Papers from Prison) as vicars in their congregations.

In 1938, the Gestapo banned Bonhoeffer from Berlin. In summer 1939, the seminary was able to move to Sigurdshof, an outlying estate (Vorwerk) of the von Kleist family in Wendish Tychow. In March 1940, the Gestapo shut down the seminary there following the outbreak of World War II. Bonhoeffer's monastic communal life and teaching at Finkenwalde seminary formed the basis of his books, The Cost of Discipleship and Life Together.

Bonhoeffer's sister, Sabine, along with her Jewish-classified husband Gerhard Leibholz and their two daughters, escaped to England by way of Switzerland in 1938.

Return to the United States 
In February 1938, Bonhoeffer made an initial contact with members of the German Resistance when his brother-in-law Hans von Dohnányi introduced him to a group seeking Hitler's overthrow at the Abwehr, the German military intelligence service.

Bonhoeffer also learned from Dohnányi that war was imminent. He was particularly troubled by the prospect of being conscripted. As a committed pacifist opposed to the Nazi regime, he could never swear an oath to Hitler and fight in his army, though refusal to do so was potentially a capital offense. He worried also about consequences his refusing military service could have for the Confessing Church, as it was a move that would be frowned upon by most Christians and their churches at the time.

It was at this juncture that Bonhoeffer left for the United States in June 1939 at the invitation of Union Theological Seminary in New York. Amid much inner turmoil, he soon regretted his decision and returned after two weeks despite strong pressures from his friends to stay in the United States. He wrote to Reinhold Niebuhr:

Abwehr agent 

Back in Germany, Bonhoeffer was further harassed by the Nazi authorities as he was forbidden to speak in public and was required regularly to report his activities to the police. In 1941, he was forbidden to print or to publish. In the meantime, Bonhoeffer had joined the Abwehr, a German military intelligence organization. Dohnányi, already part of the Abwehr, brought him into the organization on the claim that his wide ecumenical contacts would be of use to Germany, thus protecting him from conscription to active service. Bonhoeffer presumably knew about various 1943 plots against Hitler through Dohnányi, who was actively involved in the planning. In the face of Nazi atrocities, the full scale of which Bonhoeffer learned through the Abwehr, he concluded that "the ultimate question for a responsible man to ask is not how he is to extricate himself heroically from the affair, but how the coming generation shall continue to live." He did not justify his action but accepted that he was taking guilt upon himself as he wrote, "When a man takes guilt upon himself in responsibility, he imputes his guilt to himself and no one else. He answers for it... Before other men he is justified by dire necessity; before himself he is acquitted by his conscience, but before God he hopes only for grace." (In a 1932 sermon, Bonhoeffer said, "The blood of martyrs might once again be demanded, but this blood, if we really have the courage and loyalty to shed it, will not be innocent, shining like that of the first witnesses for the faith. On our blood lies heavy guilt, the guilt of the unprofitable servant who is cast into outer darkness.")

Under cover of the Abwehr, Bonhoeffer served as a courier for the German resistance movement to reveal its existence and intentions to the Western Allies in hope of garnering their support, and, through his ecumenical contacts abroad, to secure possible peace terms with the Allies for a post-Hitler government. His visits to Norway, Sweden, Denmark, and Switzerland were camouflaged as legitimate intelligence activities for the Abwehr. In May 1942, he met Anglican Bishop George Bell of Chichester, a member of the House of Lords and an ally of the Confessing Church, contacted by Bonhoeffer's exiled brother-in-law Leibholz; through him feelers were sent to British Foreign Secretary Anthony Eden. However, the British government ignored these, as it had all other approaches from the German resistance. Dohnányi and Bonhoeffer were also involved in Abwehr operations to help German Jews escape to Switzerland. During this time Bonhoeffer worked on Ethics and wrote letters to keep up the spirits of his former students. He intended Ethics as his magnum opus, but it remained unfinished when he was arrested. On 5 April 1943, Bonhoeffer and Dohnányi were arrested and imprisoned.

Imprisonment 
On 13 January 1943, Bonhoeffer had become engaged to Maria von Wedemeyer, the granddaughter of his close friend and Finkenwalde seminary supporter, Ruth von Kleist Retzow. Ruth had campaigned for this marriage for several years, although up until late October 1942, Bonhoeffer remained a reluctant suitor despite Ruth being part of his innermost circle. A large age gap loomed between Bonhoeffer and Maria: he was 36 to her 18. Bonhoeffer had first met his would-be fiancée Maria when she was his confirmation student at age eleven. The two also spent almost no time alone together prior to the engagement and did not see each other between becoming engaged and Bonhoeffer's 5 April arrest. Once he was in prison, however, Maria's status as a fiancée became invaluable, as it meant she could visit Bonhoeffer and correspond with him. While their relationship was troubled, she was a source of food and smuggled messages. Bonhoeffer made Eberhard Bethge his heir, but Maria, in allowing her correspondence with Bonhoeffer to be published after her death, provided an invaluable addition to the scholarship.

For a year and a half, Bonhoeffer was imprisoned at Tegel Prison awaiting trial. There he continued his work in religious outreach among his fellow prisoners and guards. Sympathetic guards helped smuggle his letters out of prison to Eberhard Bethge and others, and these uncensored letters were posthumously published in Letters and Papers from Prison. One of those guards, a corporal named Knobloch, even offered to help him escape from the prison and "disappear" with him, and plans were made for that end but Bonhoeffer declined it, fearing Nazi retribution against his family, especially his brother Klaus and brother-in-law Hans von Dohnányi, who was also imprisoned.

After the failure of the 20 July Plot on Hitler's life in 1944 and the discovery in September 1944 of secret Abwehr documents relating to the conspiracy, Bonhoeffer was accused of association with the conspirators. He was transferred from the military prison Tegel in Berlin, where he had been held for 18 months, to the detention cellar of the house prison of the Reich Security Main Office, the Gestapo's high-security prison. In February 1945, he was secretly moved to Buchenwald concentration camp, and finally to Flossenbürg concentration camp.

On 4 April 1945, the diaries of Admiral Wilhelm Canaris, head of the Abwehr, were discovered, and in a rage upon reading them, Hitler ordered that the Abwehr conspirators be destroyed. Bonhoeffer was led away just as he concluded his final Sunday service and asked an English prisoner, Payne Best, to remember him to Bishop George Bell of Chichester if he should ever reach his home: "This is the end—for me the beginning of life."

Execution 

Bonhoeffer was sentenced to death on 8 April 1945 by SS judge Otto Thorbeck at a drumhead court-martial without witnesses, records of proceedings or a defense in Flossenbürg concentration camp. He was executed there by hanging at dawn on 9 April 1945. Bonhoeffer was stripped of his clothing and led naked into the execution yard where he was hanged with six others: Admiral Wilhelm Canaris; General Hans Oster, Canaris's deputy; General Karl Sack, a military jurist; businessman Theodor Strünck; and German resistance fighter Ludwig Gehre. Bonhoeffer's brother, Klaus Bonhoeffer, and his brother-in-law, Rüdiger Schleicher, were executed in Berlin on the night of 22–23 April as Soviet troops were already fighting in the capital. His brother-in-law Hans von Dohnányi had been executed in Sachsenhausen concentration camp on 9 April.

Eberhard Bethge, a student and friend of Bonhoeffer's, writes of a man who saw the execution: I saw Pastor Bonhoeffer... kneeling on the floor praying fervently to God. I was most deeply moved by the way this lovable man prayed, so devout and so certain that God heard his prayer. At the place of execution, he again said a short prayer and then climbed the few steps to the gallows, brave and composed. His death ensued after a few seconds. In the almost fifty years that I worked as a doctor, I have hardly ever seen a man die so entirely submissive to the will of God.

This is the traditional account of Bonhoeffer's death, which over the decades went unchallenged; however, many recent biographers see problems with the story, not due to Bethge but his source. The purported witness was a doctor at Flossenbürg concentration camp, Hermann Fischer-Hüllstrung, who may have wished to minimize the suffering of the condemned men to reduce his own culpability in their executions. J.L.F. Mogensen, a former prisoner at Flossenbürg, cited the length of time it took for the execution to be completed (almost six hours), plus departures from camp procedure that would probably not have been allowed to prisoners so late in the war, as jarring inconsistencies. Considering that the sentences had been confirmed at the highest levels of Nazi government, by individuals with a pattern of torturing prisoners who dared to challenge the regime, it is more likely that "the physical details of Bonhoeffer's death may have been much more difficult than we earlier had imagined."

Other recent critics of the traditional account are more caustic. One terms the Fischer-Hüllstrung story as "unfortunately a lie," citing additional factual inconsistencies; for example, the doctor described Bonhoeffer climbing the steps to the noose, but at Flossenbürg the gallows had no steps.  Moreover, it appears that "Fischer-Hüllstrung had the job of reviving political prisoners after they had been hanged until they were almost dead, in order to prolong the agony of their dying." Another critic charges that Fischer-Hüllstrung's "subsequent statement about Bonhoeffer as kneeling in wordy prayer ... belongs to the realm of legend."

The disposition of Bonhoeffer's remains is not known. His body may have been cremated outside the camp along with hundreds of other recently executed or dead prisoners, or American troops may have placed his body in one of several mass graves in which they interred the unburied dead of the camp.

Legacy 

Bonhoeffer's life as a pastor and theologian of great intellect and spirituality who lived as he preached – and his being killed because of his opposition to National Socialism – exerted great influence and inspiration for Christians across broad denominations and ideologies including Martin Luther King Jr. and the Civil Rights Movement in the United States and the anti-communist democratic movement in Eastern Europe during the Cold War.

Bonhoeffer is commemorated in the liturgical calendars of several Christian denominations on the anniversary of his death, 9 April. This includes many parts of the Anglican Communion, where he is sometimes identified as a martyr, and other times not.
His commemoration in the liturgical calendar of the Evangelical Lutheran Church in America uses the liturgical color of white, which is typically used for non-martyred saints.
In 2008, the General Conference of the United Methodist Church, which does not enumerate saints, officially recognized Bonhoeffer as a "modern-day martyr". He was the first martyr to be so recognized who lived after the Reformation, and is one of only two as of 2017.

Bonhoeffer is remembered in the Church of England with a commemoration on 9 April.

The Deutsche Evangelische Kirche in Sydenham, London, at which he preached between 1933 and 1935, was destroyed by bombing in 1944. A replacement church was built in 1958 and named Dietrich-Bonhoeffer-Kirche in his honor.

Dietrich Bonhoeffer's text 'By Gentel Powers' is known to a large audience as a worship song. The song is often sung at funerals. In 2021 it was voted the most popular hymn in Germany. The best-known melody was written by Siegfried Fietz in 1970.

Theological legacy 

Overshadowed by the dramatic events of his life, Bonhoeffer's theology has nevertheless been influential. His theology has a fragmentary, unsystematic nature, due at least in part to his untimely death, and is subject to diverse and contradictory interpretations, sometimes necessarily based on speculation and projection. So, for example, while his Christocentric approach appeals to conservative, confession-minded Protestants, his commitment to justice and ideas about "religionless Christianity" are emphasized by liberal Protestants.

Central to Bonhoeffer's theology is Christ, in whom God and the world are reconciled. Bonhoeffer's God is a suffering God, whose manifestation is found in this worldliness. Bonhoeffer believed that the Incarnation of God in flesh made it unacceptable to speak of God and the world "in terms of two spheres"—an implicit attack upon Luther's doctrine of the two kingdoms. Bonhoeffer stressed personal and collective piety and revived the idea of imitation of Christ. He argued that Christians should not retreat from the world but act within it. He believed that two elements were constitutive of faith: the implementation of justice and the acceptance of divine suffering. Bonhoeffer insisted that the church, like the Christians, "had to share in the sufferings of God at the hands of a godless world" if it were to be a true church of Christ.

In his prison letters, Bonhoeffer raised tantalizing questions about the role of Christianity and the church in a "world come of age," where human beings no longer need a metaphysical God as a stop-gap to human limitations; and mused about the emergence of a "religionless Christianity," where God would be unclouded from metaphysical constructs of the previous 1900 years. Influenced by Barth's distinction between faith and religion, Bonhoeffer had a critical view of the phenomenon of religion and asserted that revelation abolished religion, which he called the "garment" of faith. Having witnessed the complete failure of the German Protestant church as an institution in the face of Nazism, he saw this challenge as an opportunity of renewal for Christianity.

Years after Bonhoeffer's death, some Protestant thinkers developed his critique into a thoroughgoing attack against traditional Christianity in the "Death of God" movement, which briefly attracted the attention of the mainstream culture in the mid-1960s. However, some critics—such as Jacques Ellul and others—have charged that those radical interpretations of Bonhoeffer's insights amount to a grave distortion, that Bonhoeffer did not mean to say that God no longer had anything to do with humanity and had become a mere cultural artifact. More recent Bonhoeffer interpretation is more cautious in this regard, respecting the parameters of the neo-orthodox school to which he belonged. Bonhoeffer also influenced Comboni missionary Father Ezechiele Ramin.

Writings 
English translations of Bonhoeffer's works, most of which were originally written in German, are available. Many of his lectures and books were translated into English over the years and are available from multiple publishers. These works are listed following the Fortress Press edition of Bonhoeffer's writings. The English language edition of Bonhoeffer's Works contains, in many cases, more material than the German Works series because of the discovery of hitherto unknown correspondence.

All sixteen volumes of the English Bonhoeffer Works Edition of Bonhoeffer's Oeuvre had been published by October 2013. A volume of selected readings entitled The Dietrich Bonhoeffer Reader which presents a chronological view of Bonhoeffer's theological development became available by 1 November 2013.

Fortress Press editions of Bonhoeffer's works 
 Sanctorum Communio. Dietrich Bonhoeffer Works, Volume 1. Dietrich Bonhoeffer; Clifford Green, Editor Translated by Reinhard Krauss and Nancy Lukens. Hardcover, 392 pp;  and paperback, 386 pp; . Bonhoeffer's dissertation, completed in 1927 and first published in 1930 as Sanctorum Communio: eine Dogmatische Untersuchung zur Soziologie der Kirche. In it, he attempts to work out a theology of the person in society, and particularly in the church. Along with explaining his early positions on sin, evil, solidarity, collective spirit, and collective guilt, it unfolds a systematic theology of the Spirit at work in the church and what it implies for questions on authority, freedom, ritual, and eschatology.
 Act and Being. Dietrich Bonhoeffer Works, Volume 2. Dietrich Bonhoeffer; Wayne Whitson Floyd and Hans Richard Reuter, Editors; Translated by H. Martin Rumscheidt. Hardcover, 256 pp: . Bonhoeffer's second dissertation, written in 1929–1930 and published in 1931 as Akt und Sein, deals with the consciousness and conscience in theology from the perspective of the Reformation's insight into the origin sinfulness in the "heart turned in upon itself and thus open neither to the revelation of God nor to the encounter with the neighbor." Bonhoeffer's thoughts about power, revelation, Otherness, theological method, and theological anthropology are explained.
 Creation and Fall. Dietrich Bonhoeffer Works, Volume 3.  Dietrich Bonhoeffer; John W. De Gruchy, Editor Translated by Douglas Stephen Bax. In 1932, Bonhoeffer called on his students at the University of Berlin to focus their attention on the word of God, the word of truth, in a time of turmoil. Hardcover, 214 pp:  . Paper, 224 pp: .
 Discipleship. Dietrich Bonhoeffer Works, Volume 4.  Dietrich Bonhoeffer; John D. Dodsey and Geffrey B. Kelly, Editors. Originally published in 1937, this book (generally known in English by the title The Cost of Discipleship) soon became a classic exposition of what it means to follow Christ in a modern world beset by a dangerous and criminal government. Hardcover, 384 pp: .  Paper, 354 pp: .
 Life Together and Prayerbook of the Bible. Dietrich Bonhoeffer Works, Volume 5. Dietrich Bonhoeffer; James H. Burtness and Geffrey B. Kelly, Editors; Translated by Daniel W. Bloesch. Hardcover, 242 pp: . Paper, 232 pp: . Life Together is a classic which contains Bonhoeffer's meditation on the nature of the Christian community. Prayerbook of the Bible is a classic meditation on the importance of the Psalms for Christian prayer. In this theological interpretation of the Psalms, Bonhoeffer describes the moods of an individual's relationship with God and also the turns of love and heartbreak, of joy and sorrow, that are themselves the Christian community's path to God.
 Ethics. Dietrich Bonhoeffer Works, Volume 6. Dietrich Bonhoeffer; Clifford Green, Editor; Translated by Reinhard Krauss, Douglas W. Stott, and Charles C. West. Despite remaining incomplete at the time of Bonhoeffer's execution, this book is central to understanding Bonhoeffer's body of work. Ethics is the culmination of his theological and personal odyssey. Hardcover, 544 pp: . Paperback, 605 pp: .
 Fiction from Tegel Prison. Dietrich Bonhoeffer Works, Volume 7. Dietrich Bonhoeffer; Clifford Green, Editor Translated by Nancy Lukens. Hardcover, 288 pp: . Writing fiction—an incomplete drama, a novel fragment, and a short story—occupied much of Bonhoeffer's first year in Tegel prison, as well as writing to his family and his fiancée and dealing with his interrogation. "There is a good deal of autobiography mixed in with it," he explained to his friend and biographer Eberhard Bethge. Richly annotated by German editors Renate Bethge and Ilse Todt and by Clifford Green, the writings in this book disclose a great deal of Bonhoeffer's family context, social world, and cultural milieu. Events from his life are recounted in a way that illuminates his theology. Characters and situations that represent Nazi types and attitudes became a form of social criticism and help to explain Bonhoeffer's participation in the resistance movement and the plot to kill Hitler.
 Letters and Papers from Prison. Dietrich Bonhoeffer Works, Volume 8. Dietrich Bonhoeffer; John W. de Gruchy, Editor; Translated by Isabel Best; Lisa E. Dahill; Reinhard Krauss; Nancy Lukens.  This splendid volume, in many ways the capstone of the Dietrich Bonhoeffer Works, is the first unabridged collection of Bonhoeffer's 1943–1945 prison letters and theological writings. Here are over 200 documents that include extensive correspondence with his family and Eberhard Bethge (much of it in English for the first time), as well as his theological notes, and his prison poems. The volume offers an illuminating introduction by editor John de Gruchy and a historical Afterword by the editors of the original German volume: Christian Gremmels, Eberhard Bethge, and Renate Bethge. Hardcover, 800 pp: .
 The Young Bonhoeffer, 1918–1927. Dietrich Bonhoeffer Works, Volume 9. Dietrich Bonhoeffer; Paul Duane Metheny, Editor.  Gathers Bonhoeffer's 100 earliest letters and journals from after the First World War through his graduation from Berlin University. Hardcover, 720 pp: . This work gathers his earliest letters and journals through his graduation from Berlin University. It also contains his early theological writings up to his dissertation. The seventeen essays include works on the patristic period for Adolf von Harnack, on Luther's moods for Karl Holl, on biblical interpretation for Professor Reinhold Seeberg, as well as essays on the church and eschatology, reason and revelation, Job, John, and even joy. Rounding out this picture of Bonhoeffer's nascent theology are his sermons from the period, along with his lectures on homiletics, catechesis, and practical theology.
 Barcelona, Berlin, New York: 1928–1931. Dietrich Bonhoeffer Works, Volume 10. Dietrich Bonhoeffer; Clifford Green, Editor. This period from 1928 to 1931, which followed the completion of his dissertation, was formative for Bonhoeffer's personal, pastoral, and theological direction. Hardcover, 790 pp: .
 Ecumenical, Academic and Pastoral Work: 1931–1932, Dietrich Bonhoeffer's Works, Volume 11, is a translation of Ökumene, Universität, Pfarramt: 1931–1932. Hardcover, 576 pp: .
 Berlin: 1932–1933. Dietrich Bonhoeffer Works, Volume 12. Dietrich Bonhoeffer; Larry L. Rasmussen, Editor. Translated by Isabel Best, David Higgins, and Douglas W. Stott. Berlin documents the crisis of 1933 in Germany as Bonhoeffer taught "on a faculty whose theology he did not share."  Hardcover, 650 pp: .
 London, 1933–1935. Dietrich Bonhoeffer's Works, Volume 13. Dietrich Bonhoeffer; Keith C. Clements, Editor. Translated by Isabel Best. Includes records and minutes of his congregational meetings, reports from international conferences from 1934, more than 20 sermons he preached in London, and more. Hardcover, 550 pp: .
 Theological Education at Finkenwalde: 1935–1937, Dietrich Bonhoeffer's Works, Volume 14, is a translation of Illegale Theologenausbildung: 1935–1937, was released on 1 October 2013. The publisher's description of the volume is thus: "In the spring of 1935 Dietrich Bonhoeffer returned from England to direct a small illegal seminary for the Confessing Church.  The seminary existed for two years before the Gestapo ordered it closed in August 1937. The two years of Finkenwalde's existence produced some of Bonhoeffer's most significant theological work as he prepared these young seminarians for the turbulence and risk of parish ministry in the Confessing Church. Bonhoeffer and his seminarians were under Gestapo surveillance; some of them were arrested and imprisoned. Throughout, he remained dedicated to training them for the ministry and its challenges in a difficult time. This volume includes bible studies, sermons, and lectures on homiletics, pastoral care, and catechesis, giving a moving and up-close portrait of the Confessing Church in these crucial years—the same period during which Bonhoeffer wrote his classics, Discipleship and Life Together."
 Theological Education Underground: 1937–1940, Dietrich Bonhoeffer's Works, Volume 15, is a translation of Illegale Theologenausbildung: 1937–1940. Hardcover, 750 pp: .
 Conspiracy and Imprisonment 1940–1945. Dietrich Bonhoeffer Works, Volume 16.  Dietrich Bonhoeffer; Mark Brocker, Editor Translated by Lisa E. Dahill. Hundreds of letters, including ten never-before-published letters to his fiancée, Maria von Wedemeyer, as well as official documents, short original pieces, and his final sermons. Hardcover, 912 pp: .

Various works in the Bonhoeffer corpus individually published in English 
 The Bonhoeffer Reader, edited by Clifford Green and Michael DeJonge. Fortress Press, 2013. . A representative collection of all Bonhoeffer's theological works in a single volume.
 Christology (1966) London: William Collins and New York: Harper and Row. Translation of lectures given in Berlin in 1933, from vol. 3 of Gesammelte Schriften, Christian Kaiser Verlag, 1960. retitled as Christ the Center, Harper San Francisco 1978 paperback: 
 The Cost of Discipleship (1948 in English). Touchstone edition with an introduction by Bishop George Bell and memoir by G. Leibholz, 1995 paperback: . Critical edition published under its original title Discipleship: John D. Godsey (editor); Geffrey B. Kelly (editor). Fortress Press, 2000. . Bonhoeffer's most widely read book begins, "Cheap grace is the mortal enemy of our church. Our struggle today is for costly grace." That was a sharp warning to his own church, which was engaged in bitter conflict with the official Nazified state church. First published in 1937 as Nachfolge (Discipleship), it soon became a classic exposition of what it means to follow Christ in a modern world beset by a dangerous and criminal government. At its center stands an interpretation of the Sermon on the Mount: what Jesus demanded of his followers—and how the life of discipleship is to be continued in all ages of the post-resurrection church.
 Life Together. The stimulus for the writing of Life Together was the closing of the preachers' seminary at Finkenwalde. This treatise contains Bonhoeffer's thoughts about the nature of the Christian community based on the common life that he and his seminarians experienced at the seminary and in the "Brother's House" there. Life Together was completed in 1938, published in 1939 as Gemeinsames Leben, and first translated into English in 1954. Harper San Francisco 1978 paperback: 
 Ethics (1955 in English by SCM Press). Touchstone edition, 1995 paperback: . This is the culmination of Bonhoeffer's theological and personal odyssey, even though the book was not completed and was not the Ethics which Bonhoeffer intended to have published. Based on careful reconstruction of the manuscripts, freshly and expertly translated and annotated, the critical edition features an insightful introduction by Clifford Green and an afterword from the German edition's editors. Though caught up in the vortex of momentous forces in the Nazi period, Bonhoeffer systematically envisioned a radically Christocentric, incarnational ethic for a post-war world, purposefully recasting Christians' relation to history, politics, and public life.
 Letters and Papers from Prison (Edited originally by Eberhard Bethge; first English translation 1953 by SCM Press). This edition translated by Reginald H. Fuller and Frank Clark from Widerstand und Ergebung: Briefe und Aufzeichnungen aus der Haft. Munich: Christian Kaiser Verlag (1970). Touchstone 1997 paperback: . In hundreds of letters, including letters written to his fiancée, Maria von Wedemeyer (selected from the complete correspondence, previously published as Love Letters from Cell 92 Ruth-Alice von Bismarck and Ulrich Kabitz (editors), Abingdon Press (1995) ), as well as official documents, short original pieces, and a few final sermons, the volume sheds light on Bonhoeffer's active resistance to and increasing involvement in the conspiracy against the Hitler regime; his arrest; and his long imprisonment. Finally, Bonhoeffer's many exchanges with his family, fiancée, and closest friends, demonstrate the affection and solidarity that accompanied Bonhoeffer to his prison cell, concentration camp, and eventual death.
 A Testament to Freedom: The Essential Writings of Dietrich Bonhoeffer (1990).  Geffrey B. Kelly and F. Burton Nelson, editors. Harper San Francisco 1995 2nd edition, paperback: 
 "Von guten Mächten wunderbar geborgen": "By Gentel Powers," a prayer he wrote shortly before his death. Various English translations.
 Bonhoeffer's papers are held in the Burke Library at Union Theological Seminary.

Bibliography

Further reading

Books 

 Non-fiction
 Eberhard Bethge, Dietrich Bonhoeffer: Theologian, Christian, Man for His Times: A Biography, rev. ed. (Minneapolis, Fortress Press, 2000)
Eric Metaxas, Bonhoeffer: Pastor, Martyr, Prophet, Spy (Thomas Nelson, 2011) .
 Diane Reynolds, The Doubled Life of Dietrich Bonhoeffer (Wipf & Stock, 2016)
 Keith Clements, Bonhoeffer and Britain (Churches Together in Britain and Ireland, 2006). 
 
 
 
 
Donald Goddard, The Last Days of Dietrich Bonhoeffer, Harper and Roe,1976, 
 Stephen R. Haynes,The Bonhoeffer Legacy: Post-Holocaust Perspectives (Fortress Press, 2006). .
 Geffrey B. Kelly & F. Burton Nelson (editors), A Testament to Freedom: The Essential Writings of Dietrich Bonhoeffer (Harper San Francisco, 1990) 
 Michael J. Martin, Dietrich Bonhoeffer. Champion of Freedom series. (Morgan Reynolds Publishing, 2012). . Winner of 2013 Wilbur Award for Best Book, Youth Audiences.
 John W. Matthews, Bonhoeffer: A Brief Overview of the Life and Writings of Dietrich Bonhoeffer (Lutheran University Press, 2011)
 John A. Moses, The Reluctant Revolutionary: Dietrich Bonhoeffer's Collision with Prusso-German History (New York/Oxford: Berghahn, 2009)
 
 .
 .
 .
 .
 Elisabeth Sifton and Fritz Stern, No Ordinary Men, NYRB (2013). (Bonhoeffer and von Dohnanyi)
 Craig J. Slane, Bonhoeffer as Martyr: Social Responsibility and Modern Christian Commitment (Brazos Press, 2004).
 Reggie L. Williams, Bonhoeffer's Black Jesus: Harlem Renaissance Theology and an Ethic of Resistance (Baylor University Press, 2014). 
 Fiction
 Denise Giardina, Saints and Villains (Ballantine Books, 1999). . A Fictional Account of Bonhoeffer's life.
 Mary Glazener, The Cup of Wrath: The Story of Dietrich Bonhoeffer's Resistance to Hitler (Frederic C. Beil, 1992). .
 Daniel Jándula, El Reo (Tarragona: Ediciones Noufront, 2009). 
 George Mackay Brown, Magnus (Hogarth Press, 1973) A novel in which the imprisoned 10th century Orcadian saint Magnus Erlendsson is transformed into Bonhoeffer.
 Simon Perry, All Who Came Before (Wipf and Stock, 2011), in which Bonhoeffer's ethics and actions give flesh to the historical figure, Barabbas.

Articles
 Caldas, Carlos. "70 Years later-what do we have to learn from Dietrich Bonhoeffer in Latin America today?" Stellenbosch Theological Journal 2.1 (2016): 27–42 online.
 De Gruchy John, W. "Dietrich Bonhoeffer, Nelson Mandela and the dilemma of violent resistance in retrospect." Stellenbosch Theological Journal 2.1 (2016): 43–60 online.
 Nullens, Patrick. "Luther and Bonhoeffer on the social-ethical meaning of justification by faith alone." International Review of Economics 66.3 (2019): 277–291 online.
 Rey, Daniel. "A Modern Martyr." History Today (July 2020) 70#7 pp. 22–24.
 Valčo, Michal. "The Value of Dietrich Bonhoeffer's Theological-Ethical Reading of Søren Kierkegaard." European Journal of Science and Theology 13.1 (2017): 47–58 online.

Films 
 Bonhoeffer – Martin Doblmeier, 2003
  (2000) Eric Till, PBS, 2000
 Hanged on a Twisted Cross (1996) T.N. Mohan, 1996
 A View From The Underside – The Legacy of Dietrich Bonhoeffer – Al Staggs, 1992
 .
 .
 "Come Before Winter" (2016) Produced by Dr. Gary Blount, directed by Kevin Ekvall.
 "Holy Traitor" (2023) Produced & Directed by Spencer Folmar.

Plays 
 Lies, Love and Hitler – an Australian play written by Elizabeth Avery Scott. Premiered 2010 at The Street Theatre, Canberra, Australia (directed by P.J. Williams).
 Bonhoeffer – a play written and performed by South African playwright, actor and human rights activist Peter Krummeck (directed by Christopher Weare) and premiered at Capitol Hill in Washington DC during the week commemorating the First Anniversary of 9/11.
 Bonhoeffer – an American play by Tim Jorgenson, available in a print edition (Xulon Press, 2002 ), premiered in 2004 at the Acacia Theatre Company, Milwaukee, Wisconsin.
 Bonhoeffer – a Finnish monologue play written and performed by Timo Kankainen and directed by Eija-Irmeli Lahti, premiered in January 2008 at the Seinäjoki city theatre.
 Personal Honor: Suggested by the Life of Dietrich Bonhoeffer – by Nancy Axelrad and performed by the Ricks-Weil Theatre Company (directed by Thom Johnson), premiered 1 May 2009 at the H.J. Ricks Centre for the Arts in Greenfield, Indiana.
 The Beams are Creaking – an American play by Douglas Anderson, Baker's Plays, Boston. Premiered at Case Western University in October 1978. Won the Marc A. Klein Playwright Award and Wichita State National Playwright Competition that same year.
 Bonhoeffer's Cost – based on the life of Dietrich Bonhoeffer. Written by Mary Ruth Clarke with Timothy Gregory, presented by Provision Theatre, Chicago, 17 September – 30 October 2011. The play focuses on Bonhoeffer's life from the time of his arrest.
 True Patriot – BBC2 Play of the Week (TV Series) (1977)  Director Ronald Wilson. Written by Don Shaw. Michael York plays Dietrich Bonhoeffer. Notable for ending with incomplete execution scene made to resemble Nazi film such as those known to have been made of the executions of actual and accused participants in the 20 July Bomb Plot, such as Bonhoeffer; Beethoven's Sonata No. 8 Op. 13 (Pathetique) Adagio cantabile accompanies the final scene.

Choral theater 
 "Bonhoeffer" – a choral theater piece by Thomas Lloyd, with text adapted from the writings of Dietrich Bonhoeffer and Maria von Wedemeyer. Premiered 10 March 2013 at the Philadelphia Episcopal Cathedral (performed by the chamber choir "The Crossing" conducted by Donald Nally).
 Peter Janssens composed a musical play ("Musikspiel") Dietrich Bonhoeffer in 1995 on a text by Priska Beilharz.

Verse about Bonhoeffer 
 "Friday's Child" reading by W.H. Auden, 1958

Opera 
  Bonhoeffer Ann Gebuhr, 2000

Oratorios 
 Bonhoeffer-Oratorium – composed from 1988 to 1992 by Tom Johnson for orchestra, soloists, and choir
 Ende und Anfang – composed in 2006 by Gerhard Kaufmann for orchestra, soloists, and choir and based on the writings of Bonhoeffer

Songs 
 "Dietrich Bonhoeffer," by the band The Chairman Dances

References

External links 

 Dietrich Bonhoeffer on Encyclopædia Britannica
 Bonhoeffer Reading Room with extensive links to on-line primary and sesources, Tyndale Seminary
 
 Article by Douglas Huff in The Internet Encyclopedia of Philosophy 
 Great Lives: Dietrich Bonhoeffer
 See: Maria von Wedemeyer-Weller
 "Prison Writings in a World Come of Age: The Special Vision of Dietrich Bonhoeffer", Martin E. Marty, Berfrois, 12 May 2011
 Richard Beck (8 December 2010), Bonoheffer: etsi deus non daretur
 Westminster Abbey: Dietrich Bonhoeffer
 Why the Publication of Bonhoeffer's works in German and English is so profound
 Dietrich Bonhoeffer at the Greenville Community Church

1906 births
1945 deaths
20th-century Protestant martyrs
20th-century German Protestant theologians
Anglican saints
Christian ethicists
Christian radicals
Christian humanists
Christian poets
Civilians who were court-martialed
Executed members of the 20 July plot
People who died in Flossenbürg concentration camp
German anti-fascists
German Christian pacifists
Lutheran pacifists
German civilians killed in World War II
German expatriates in the United States
German humanitarians
20th-century German Lutheran clergy
German Lutheran theologians
German evangelicals
Protestants in the German Resistance
People celebrated in the Lutheran liturgical calendar
Clergy from Wrocław
Resistance members who died in Nazi concentration camps
Union Theological Seminary (New York City) alumni
People executed by Nazi Germany by hanging
German twins
German people executed in Nazi concentration camps
Executed people from Lower Silesian Voivodeship
1945 murders in Germany
20th-century German philosophers
Executed philosophers
20th-century Lutheran theologians